Wilhelm Dietz (date of birth unknown; died 3 April 1920) was a Swiss footballer who played for FC Basel. He played mainly in the position as forward, but also as midfielder.

Football career
Between the years 1917 and 1920 Dietz played a total of 31 games for Basel scoring a total of 13 goals. 25 of these games were in the Swiss Serie A and the other six were friendly games. He scored seven goals of his goals in the domestic league, the other six goals were scored during the test games. The Serie A away match played on 7 March 1920 against Biel-Bienne in Gurzelen Stadion was the last game that Wilhelm Dietz played as he died 4 weeks later aged just 19 years old.

References

Sources
 Rotblau: Jahrbuch Saison 2017/2018. Publisher: FC Basel Marketing AG. 
 Die ersten 125 Jahre. Publisher: Josef Zindel im Friedrich Reinhardt Verlag, Basel. 
 Verein "Basler Fussballarchiv" Homepage

FC Basel players
Swiss men's footballers
Association football midfielders
Association football forwards
Year of birth missing
1920 deaths